Pasapali sari  also known as Saktapar is a Bandha (Ikat) handloom sari weaved mainly in the Bargarh district of Odisha, India. The name Pasapali is derived from pasā or gambling games using Chess board. These saris have intricate check patterns of contrast colors resembling the chess boards which gives it such name.

References

Sonepur Handloom Cluster 
bomkai silk 
sambalpuri and sonepuri patta saree 
Deal inked with national brands to promote state products

Saris
Dresses
Odia culture
Bargarh district
Handloom sarees